Kleine Donau is a river of Bavaria, Germany. Originally a branch of the Danube, it does not receive water from the Danube anymore. It starts at the confluence of the Wellenbach and the Flutkanal Kleine Donau, a branch of the Ilm, near Vohburg. It flows into the Danube near Pförring.

See also
List of rivers of Bavaria

References

Rivers of Bavaria
Rivers of Germany